Lilalu im Schepperland is a German television series from the Augsburger Puppenkiste. It is loosely based on Enid Blyton's Book of Brownies.

External links
 

2000 German television series debuts
2001 German television series endings
German children's television series
German television shows featuring puppetry
German-language television shows
Television shows based on children's books
Das Erste original programming
Adaptations of works by Enid Blyton